Kimberly Ann Chace (later Boyle, then May, born May 4, 1956) is an American retired artistic gymnast, who competed at the 1972 and 1976 Summer Olympics and placed 14th all around in 1972; her teams finished fourth in 1972 and sixth in 1976. She also won five medals at the 1971 Pan American Games, including two gold medals. In 1996, Chace was inducted into the USA Gymnastics Hall of Fame.

Chace was trained by her father. In July 1973 she married Chuck Boyle. They had a child born in 1974, and briefly ran their own gymnastics club, before divorcing by 1976. She then made her comeback to sports and finished at 14th place in the Olympic Games which was the highest in the US women's team.

Competitive history

References

1956 births
Living people
American female artistic gymnasts
Gymnasts at the 1972 Summer Olympics
Gymnasts at the 1976 Summer Olympics
Olympic gymnasts of the United States
Pan American Games medalists in gymnastics
Pan American Games gold medalists for the United States
Pan American Games silver medalists for the United States
Pan American Games bronze medalists for the United States
People from Manchester, Tennessee
Gymnasts at the 1971 Pan American Games
Medalists at the 1971 Pan American Games
21st-century American women